Krylatskoye District is a territorial division (a district, or raion) in Western Administrative Okrug, one of the 125 in the federal city of Moscow, Russia. It is located in the west of the federal city. As of the 2010 Census, the total population of the district was 78,509.

Municipal status
As a municipal division, the district is incorporated as Krylatskoye Municipal Okrug.

Economy
The offices of Intel and Microsoft are located in Krylatskoye District. Also Raiffeisen bank has an office in Krilatskoe District.

Education

International School of Moscow has its Krylatskoe Campus in the district.

References

Notes

Sources

Districts of Moscow